Kodagoda East Grama Niladhari Division is a Grama Niladhari Division of the Imaduwa Divisional Secretariat of Galle District of Southern Province, Sri Lanka. It has Grama Niladhari Division Code 171A.

Kodagoda East is a surrounded by the Horadugoda, Nalawana, Kodagoda South, Hettigoda and Wahala Kananke South Grama Niladhari Divisions.

Demographics

Ethnicity 
The Kodagoda East Grama Niladhari Division has a Sinhalese majority (100.0%). In comparison, the Imaduwa Divisional Secretariat (which contains the Kodagoda East Grama Niladhari Division) has a Sinhalese majority (99.8%)

Religion 
The Kodagoda East Grama Niladhari Division has a Buddhist majority (99.9%). In comparison, the Imaduwa Divisional Secretariat (which contains the Kodagoda East Grama Niladhari Division) has a Buddhist majority (99.5%)

References 

Grama Niladhari Divisions of Imaduwa Divisional Secretariat